Rosinda, also known as La Rosinda, is an opera in three acts and a prologue by the Italian composer Francesco Cavalli with a libretto by Giovanni Faustini. It was first performed at the Teatro Sant 'Apollinare, Venice in 1651-02 during Carnival. It appears to have been better received than La Calisto, which was also premiered that year, and was revived in Naples and/or Florence in 1653 under the title Le magie amorose. 

Its first revival in modern times was in a performing version by Jane Glover for the Oxford University Opera Club with the libretto translated into English by Anne Ridler. Glover conducted the production at the Oxford Playhouse in 1973. 
The opera was performed in 2008 in Germany (Potsdam and Bayreuth) with Francesca Lombardi Mazzulli in the title role.

Roles

Score
Cavalli's autograph score is preserved in the Biblioteca Marciana.

Recordings
There is a recording directed by Mike Fentross related to the 2008 touring production. It was released on Ludi Musici.

Extract
An aria ("Vieni, vieni in questo seno") is included in L'Arpeggiata's Cavalli compilation L'Amore Innamorato (Erato, 2015).

References

Source
Brenac, Jean-Claude, Le magazine de l'opéra baroque online at perso.orange.fr  Retrieved 9 September 2011

External links
Photo Gallery of the 2008 performances in Germany – on the official web site of Francesca Lombardi Mazzulli.

Operas
Operas by Francesco Cavalli
1653 operas
Italian-language operas